Numbered Men  is a 1930 American pre-Code prison drama film (originally with songs) produced and released by First National Pictures, a subsidiary of Warner Bros., and directed by Mervyn LeRoy. The movie stars Bernice Claire, Conrad Nagel, Raymond Hackett and Ralph Ince. The film was based on the play, entitled Jail Break, by Dwight Taylor.

Plot
Bertie "Duke" Gray (Conrad Nagel) is a counterfeiter who has been sentenced to prison for ten years. Seeing that there is no chance to escape, he accepts his fate and settles down into prison life to make the best of it. Gray is friends with Bud Leonard (played by Raymond Hackett), a young man who can not stand prison for he is in love with Mary Dane (played by Bernice Claire) and misses her terribly. To make matters worse, while Hackett is in prison, the man who framed him, played by Lou Rinaldo (played by Maurice Black), is making a play for Mary. When she tempts Bud to escape he is ready to run the risk although it may mean his death. The two plan to meet each other when Hackett discloses to her that he is being sent to work on the road gang. Mary manages to get work at a farmhouse where the convicts usually eat, hoping to thereby see Bud. Rinaldo traces her to the house and schemes to get Hackett out of the way so he can have her instead. Rinaldo convinces Hackett and yet another prisoner ("King Callahan", played by Ralph Ince) whom Rinaldo had framed that now is the time to escape in the hope that he can have them caught in the attempt. Mary prevents Hackett's escape but Callahan falls for the trick. Callahan later shoots Rinaldo and is himself killed. To save Bud, who is supposed to be released soon, Gray informs against Rinaldo, although the evidence he provides will lead to an extra prison term for him. Gray is happy to make the sacrifice, knowing that Mary will be with the man she truly loves.

Songs
Although music was mentioned when the film was in production and first previewed, ads and reviews soon mentioned that, although Bernice Claire was primarily a musical comedy star, there would be no singing in the picture. This was due to the public's apathy and aversion to anything musical during the latter part of the summer of 1930. Current existing prints of Numbered Men are missing at least five minutes of film. The complete musical film was released intact in countries outside the United States where a backlash against musicals never occurred. It is unknown whether a copy of this full version still exists.

Cast
Bernice Claire as Mary Dane 
Conrad Nagel as 26521 (Bertie "Duke" Gray)
Raymond Hackett as 31857 (Bud Leonard)  
Ralph Ince as 33410 ("King Callahan")
Ivan Linow as 41226 ("Babyface") 
George Cooper as 27635 ("Happy Howard")  
Fred Howard as 50134 (Jimmy Martin)
Tully Marshall as Lemuel Barnes
Maurice Black as Lou Rinaldo 
Blanche Friderici as Mrs. Miller

Preservation
The film survives only in the cut version which was released in late 1930 by Warner Brothers, with the musical sections removed. This version has been broadcast on television and cable.

References
Notes

External links

1930 films
Films directed by Mervyn LeRoy
First National Pictures films
1930s English-language films
Warner Bros. films
American black-and-white films
American drama films
1930 drama films
1930s American films